21. Peron (21st Platform) was a Turkish progressive rock band in the 1970s. The band participated in the 1979 Eurovision Song Contest with a song called "Seviyorum". The band were due to perform in the final; however, due to political concerns, the Turkish Republic did not attend the final, which took place in Israel.

Formation

The foundations of the group were laid at the Turkish High School, Music and Folk Dance Competition, organized by the Milliyet newspaper in 1970. İzmir Koleji participated in the competition with "The Only Voice of Only". Andreas Wildermann was the keyboardist of the group. Haluk Öztekin, the guitarist who would join the group later, was also present. In their performances, they sometimes interpreted songs of famous groups such as The Who in addition to their compositions. In 1973, Öztekin and Wildermann entered the Aegean University. 21. Peron was founded in Bornova, Izmir, on 11 July 1973, during the meeting of 6 people at the 11th bus stop at 11 o'clock. The first formation of the group included Wildermann as the keyboardist, Öztekin and Seyhan Eriş as the guitarists, Aron Serez as the bassist, Halil Yildirim as the drummer, and Alp Gültekin as the violinist. The band played foreign rock music and Anatolian rock music, which was popular during that period. In 1974, they prepared a single for Ümit Tuncağ, a radio program on TRT (Turkish Radio Television). During this period, they began to make their compositions. They started doing concerts in the year 1975. In May 1975, they made their first recordings at the homes of various friends. The songs on these records include  "Anne", "18400 TL", "F.M.O. (maybe movie music)", and "Childhood Memorials".

Eurovision Song Contest and dissolution

The band participated in the 1979 Eurovision Song Contest with a song called "Seviyorum" (I love), written by Epik. However, a month later, Turkey decided not to participate in the contest, which was held in Israel, because of pressure from Arab countries. Epik and 21. Peron recorded song titles like "I Love" the same year. This record was in soft rock and pop instead of Peron's earlier works. Half of the album was composed by Epik, and the other half was composed by 21. Peron. Two of them were Necati Cumali poems ("Rainy Sea" and "Next to the Day"), and two of them came from Orhan Veli Kanık poems ("I can not say" and "Suddenly") with their compositions. They decided to leave Epik and continue their solo career as the group's producers were not satisfied with the changes to the group. However, in 1980, the group members decided to go their separate ways and disbanded them.

Reunion and Tapon 
Wildermann, Öztekin, Akçay, Erdem and Gültekin reunited in 2012, along with a new, young singer named Deniz Yıldırım. In March 2014, they released their third album Tapon ("rubbish").

References

Turkish rock music groups